Gazment Bardhi (born 6 July 1986) is an Albanian lawyer and politician who formerly served as Albania's Minister of Justice in 2017. A noted legal expert in albanian politics, he played an important role in the drafting of the much debated Vetting Law, one of the key components of the country's judicial reform process. On January 19, 2019 Bardhi was elected as General Secretary of the Democratic Party, defeating his opponent Dorjan Teliti by a vote of 277–44. Two years later, he was elected member of the assembly on September 10, 2021 to serve in the 31st legislature, representing the Democratic Party in Elbasan.

Career
 Legal advisor at the Ministry of Justice (2012)
 Opponency Director at the General Directorate of Codification (2012–13)
 Legal expert in the Albanian Parliament (2013–2017)
 Minister of Justice (2017)
 Secretary for legal matters in the Democratic Party (2017–2019)
 General Secretary of the Democratic Party (2019–present)
 Member of the Assembly (2021–present)

Personal life
Gazment Bardhi is the nephew of Ibrahim Bardhi, the former chairman of the District Council for the region of Kavajë (1992–1996). He is also a close relative of Ervin Bardhi, a former football player who competed for Besa Kavajë and Partizani Tirana in the Kategoria Superiore.

See also 
 List of Justice Ministers

References

1986 births
Living people
Government ministers of Albania
Justice ministers of Albania
Cabinet ministers from Kavajë
Members of the Parliament of Albania